Spišská Kapitula (both meaning the "Spiš Chapter house") is an exceptionally well-preserved ecclesiastical town on the outskirts of Spišské Podhradie, Slovakia, and overlooking Spiš Castle. It is part of the UNESCO World Heritage Site "Levoča, Spiš Castle and the associated cultural monuments".

The town consists of St. Martin's Cathedral (dedicated to St. Martin of Tours), a former monastery, and a single street, all of mediaeval construction and enclosed by a wall. The lower gate gives an extensive view of Spiš Castle, located on an opposite hill. Spišská Kapitula became the main seat of the church administration in the region in the 12th century. In 1776 it became the seat of the Diocese of Spiš (Szepes).

Town and history
The town consists of St. Martin's Cathedral (dedicated to St. Martin of Tours); a former monastery; and a single street, all of medieval construction and enclosed by a wall. The lower gate gives an extensive view of Spiš Castle, located on an opposite hill.

Spišská Kapitula became the main seat of the church administration in the region in the 12th century. In 1776 it became the seat of the Diocese of Spiš (Szepes).

The cathedral was built between the 13th and 15th centuries in the Romanesque and Gothic styles. It is one of the largest and most interesting Romanesque monuments in Slovakia. It contains many medieval carved altars and is the resting place of many lords of Spiš Castle; the 15th century carved marble tombstones of the Zápolya family are of exceptional quality. A recently restored wall-painting from 1317 depicts the coronation of Charles I as the King of Hungary; another painting in the cathedral is the source for the provisional name of the anonymous Master of Kirchdrauf.

Spišská Kapitula was visited by Pope John Paul II in 1995.

St. Martin's Cathedral 

St. Martin's Cathedral, the Romanesque Catholic cathedral in Spišská Kapitula is a local part of the town Spišské Podhradie in the district of Levoča. It is also the parochial church. It is a Romanesque-Gothic cathedral, built in the first third of the 13th century pseudo-basilica with a central nave, two aisles  and one transept. In 2003, the remains of Bishop Ján Vojtašák (1877-1965) were deposited in the cathedral.

It is one of the largest and most interesting Romanesque monuments in Slovakia. It contains many medieval carved altars and is the resting place of many lords of Spiš Castle; the 15th century carved marble tombstones of the Zápoľský family are of exceptional quality. A recently restored wall-painting from 1317 depicts the coronation of Charles I as the King of Hungary; another painting in the cathedral is the source for the provisional name of the anonymous Master of Kirchdrauf (the former name of Spišské Podhradie).

Spišská Kapitula became the main seat of the church administration in the region in the 12th century. In 1776 it became the seat of the Diocese of Spiš, after Hungarian queen Maria Theresa split the Diocese of Eger (now Archidiocese of Eger). The Cathedral is one of the most valuable examples of Late-Gothic and Gothic architecture in Slovakia.

Images

References

Citations

General references

Gabor Méry, Marcell Jankovics - St. Martin's Cathedral Spišská Kapitula (2013), Šamorín (Somorja) 
Vladimír Olejník, Ľubica Olejníková - Katedrála sv. Martina v Spišskej Kapitule (2017), Spišské Podhradie: Rímskokatolícka cirkev Biskupstvo Spišské Podhradie 
https://www.spisskyhrad.com/lokalita/spisska-kapitula/
http://apsida.sk/c/3195/spisska-kapitula
https://www.unesconadosah.sk/en/location/spisska-kapitula-spis-chapter

External links
 Detailed description of Spišská Kapitula

Spiš
World Heritage Sites in Slovakia
Roman Catholic cathedrals in Slovakia
Fortified settlements
Churches in Prešov Region